The A.K.A.s, a.k.a. The A.K.A.s (Are Everywhere!) is a band that started in Pittsburgh then followed in New York City and later relocated to Philadelphia, Pennsylvania. They call their music "dancehall fight music" They released their debut album "White Doves & Smoking Guns" on Fueled by Ramen's record label. The second album, "Everybody Make Some Noise!" was released March 18, 2008 on Metropolis Records.

Vocalist Mike Ski and keyboardist Josie Outlaw also make an appearance on Melissa Cross's instruction DVD, the Zen of Screaming.The A.K.A.s also appear on Asian Man Records' Plea For Peace, Vol. 2 compilation CD with Confessions of a Dangerous mouth.

Members

Current members

 Mike Ski - lead vocals
 Josie Outlaw - keyboard

Previous Members

 Chris Bazan - guitar
 Chachi Darin - drums
 Lukas Previn - guitar
 Chad Bowser - bass
 Bobby Williams - drums
 Michael Camino - bass guitar
 Justin Perry - bass guitar
 Vegas Davis - guitar
 Mark Toohey - drums
 Nina Aron - keyboards

Discography
{|class="wikitable"
!Date of release
!Title
!Record label
|-
| September 9, 2003
| White Doves & Smoking Guns
| Fueled by Ramen
|-
| March 18, 2008
| Everybody Make Some Noise!
| Metropolis Records
|-
| June 25, 2009
| Animal Summer
| Paper + Plastick
|-
|}

References

External links
Official website
Interview with COMA Music Magazine Part One
Interview with COMA Music Magazine Part Two
Interview @ SHOUT! Music Webzine
The A.K.A.s' Mike Ski Makes Some Noise Feature article. PlugInMusic.com
Warped Tour 2009 - Interview
Mike Ski on animal rights

Dance-rock musical groups
Indie rock musical groups from Pennsylvania
Fueled by Ramen artists
Musical groups established in 2003
Metropolis Records artists